Gonzalo Herrera Olivares (died 20 September 1579) was a Roman Catholic prelate who served as Auxiliary Bishop of Burgos (1568–1579).

Biography
On 23 July 1568, Gonzalo Herrera Olivares was appointed during the papacy of Pope Pius V as Auxiliary Bishop of Burgos and Titular Bishop of Laodicea in Phrygia. On 25 July 1568, he was consecrated bishop by Scipione Rebiba, Cardinal-Priest of Sant'Angelo in Pescheria, with Felice Peretti Montalto, Bishop of Sant'Agata de' Goti, and Umberto Locati, Bishop of Bagnoregio, serving as co-consecrators. He served as Auxiliary Bishop of Burgos until his death on 20 September 1579. While bishop, he was the principal co-consecrator of Sebastián Lartaún, Bishop of Cuzco (1571).

References 

17th-century Roman Catholic bishops in Spain
Bishops appointed by Pope Pius V
1579 deaths